Adam Handling (born 17 September 1988 in Dundee, Scotland) is a British chef and restaurateur. He is the owner of the Adam Handling Restaurant Group which encompasses five food and drink venues across London.

Career
Handling started his culinary training aged 16 as the first apprentice chef at Gleneagles Hotel in Scotland. He went on to work in London before becoming sous chef at the Malmaison hotel in Newcastle. He then moved back to Scotland to become the Fairmont Group's youngest ever head chef at the Fairmont St Andrews. Handling took on the role of head chef at St. Ermin's Hotel in St James's Park, London. From there, he entered and became a finalist in series 6 of Masterchef: The Professionals in 2013.

Handling officially opened Restaurant Adam Handling at Caxton in 2014, which won a three rosettes award from the AA. The next year, it was named Best Newcomer UK Restaurant by Food and Travel Magazine.

Handling published his first cookbook in October 2014, entitled Smile or Get Out of the Kitchen, with a foreword by Masterchef judge Monica Galetti.

In June 2016, Handling opened his first independent restaurant, The Frog, in Spitalfields, London, and appeared in series 11 of Great British Menu.

Adam Handling was chosen to cook for the G7 world leaders during the G7 Summit 2021 in Cornwall. In keeping with the goal of making the event “carbon-neutral,” most ingredients were sourced from within a 100-mile radius.

Restaurants
Adam Handling Restaurant Group encompasses five food and drink venues across London. The Group is committed to a zero waste policy and eventually eliminating all food wastage by creating dishes from offcuts that are usually thrown away. Frog by Adam Handling opened in September 2017, alongside bar venue Eve Bar.

The Group’s first pub, The Loch & The Tyne in Old Windsor was opened in May 2021. Handling opened first restaurant and bar by the coast, Ugly Butterfly on the Carbis Bay Estate in St. Ives Cornwall in August 2021.

The Group also launched Hame in May 2020, a home delivery service that provides their restaurant food at home and delivers nationally.

Awards and honours

 Handling won an Acorn Award in 2013 and was the youngest person to be listed by magazine The Caterer as one of the "30 under 30 to watch".
 Awarded British Culinary Federation's "Chef of the Year 2014".
 Handling won the overall title at the Scottish Chef of the Year Awards in 2015.
 Handling's restaurants have won awards from the Food and Travel Magazine Awards, including "London Restaurant of The Year" and "UK Best Restaurant of the Year" in 2017, and "Best Newcomer Restaurant" in 2018.
 Handling was named Chef of the Year by the magazine in 2019.
 His venues won "Wine List of the Year" at the 2019 Wine List Confidential Awards and "Cocktail List of the Year" at the 2019 National Restaurant Awards.
 Adam Handling was awarded Restaurateur of the year in the British GQ Food and Drink Awards 2020.
 Handling has been honoured on Scottish Power’s COP26 Green Power List.
 He is the Head Chef Judge of the Young Chef Young Waiter Competition 2021.
 Handling's flagship restaurant Frog was awarded its first Michelin star in the 2022 Michelin Guide.

Bibliography

References 

1988 births
Living people
Place of birth missing (living people)
British chefs
British restaurateurs
British television personalities